Bunny is the nickname of:

Male 
 Bunny Ahearne (1900–1985), British ice hockey promoter
 Bunny Adair (1905–1994), Queensland politician and roustabout
 Bunny Allen (1906–2002), English hunter and safari guide
 Allu Arjun (born 1983), Indian actor
 Bunny Austin (1906–2000), British tennis player
 Bunny Berigan (1908–1942), American jazz trumpeter
 Bunny Breckinridge (1903–1996), American actor and drag queen best known for playing "The Ruler" in the film Plan 9 from Outer Space
 Bunny Brief (1892–1963), American baseball player
 Bunny Brunel (born 1950), French-born American jazz bassist
 Bunny Carr (1927–2018), Irish businessman and former television presenter
 Harold E. Comstock (1920–2009), American World War II fighter ace
 Bunny Currant (1911–2006), British Second World War fighter ace
 Napoleon Dame (1913–2006), Canadian ice hockey player
 Andrew Ramsay Don-Wauchope (1861–1948), Scottish rugby union player
 Bunny Downs (1894–1973), American baseball player
 Alec Eason (1889–1956), Australian rules footballer
 Bunny Fabrique (1887–1960), American baseball player
 Shirley Bunnie Foy (1936–2016), American jazz singer and songwriter
 David Garnett (1892–1981), British writer and publisher
 Bunny Gibbons, American funfair proprietor
 John Godwin (baseball) (1877–1956), American baseball player
 Bunny Grant (1940–2018), Jamaican retired boxer
 James Bernard Harkin (1875–1955), Canadian government bureaucrat, environmentalist and journalist
 E. Roland Harriman (1895–1978), American financier and philanthropist
 Bunny Hearn (1891–1959), American baseball pitcher
 Hugh High (1887–1962), American baseball player
 Andrew Huang (hacker) (born 1975), American hacker
 Bunny Jacob, Indian businessman and conductor
 Bunny Johnson (born 1947), British retired boxer
 Stanley Albert Joseph (1928–2001), Canadian lacrosse goaltender
 Bunny Larkin (born 1936), English retired footballer 
 Michel Larocque (1952–1992), Canadian ice hockey player 
 Bunny Lee (1941–2020), Jamaican record producer
 Bunny Lewis (1918–2001), English music manager, record producer, and composer
 Bunny Mack (1945–2015), Sierra Leonean musician
 Bunny Madden (1882–1954), American baseball player
 Bunny Matthews (1951–2021), American cartoonist
 Bunny Nunn (1927–2008), Australian soccer player
 Graham Onions (born 1982), English cricketer
 Bunny Pearce (1885–1933), American baseball player
 Bunny Phyoe (born 1992), Burmese R&B singer, songwriter, and actor
 Bunny Reid (1910–1976), South African rugby union player
 Bunny Roger (1911–1997), English couturier, inventor of Capri pants
 Bunny Roser (1901–1979), American baseball player
 Bunny Rugs (1948–2014), Jamaican reggae musician and singer
 Bunny Sigler (1941–2017), American pop and R&B songwriter and record producer
 Bunny Sterling (1948–2018), Jamaican-born British boxer
 Awdry Vaucour (1890–1918), English First World War flying ace
 Bernard Wadsworth, Canadian football player
 Bunny Wailer (1947–2021), Jamaican musician
 Bunny Walters (1953–2016), New Zealand singer and actor
 C. E. Webber (1909–1969), British television writer and playwright
 Edmund Wilson (1895–1972), American writer and critic
 Bernard Youens (1918–1984), English character actor best known for playing Stan Ogden in the soap opera Coronation Street

Female 
 Bunny Campione, British antiques expert and television personality
 Bunny DeBarge (born 1955), American singer, part of the R&B musical group Debarge
 Bunny Gibson (born 1946), American actress
 Bunny Greenhouse, American U.S. Army engineer and whistleblower
 Bunny Guinness (born 1955), British landscape architect, journalist and radio personality
 Bunny Hoest (born 1932), American comic strip writer 
 Marian Koshland (1921–1997), American microbiologist and immunologist
 Bunny McBride, American ethnohistorian and poet
 Rachel Lambert Mellon (1910–2014), American horticulturalist, philanthropist, and art collector
 Bunny Meyer (born 1985), American YouTube personality
 L. R. Wright (1939–2001), Canadian mystery writer
 Bunny Yeager (1930–2014), American pin-up photographer and model

See also 

 
 
 Rabbit (nickname)

Lists of people by nickname